Oflag XXI-C  was a German Army World War II prisoner-of-war camp for officers (Offizierlager) located in Ostrzeszów in German-occupied Poland. It held mostly Norwegian officers arrested in 1942 and 1943, but also Dutch, Italian, Serbian and Soviet POWs. Originally most Norwegian soldiers and officers had been released after the end of the Norwegian campaign, but as resistance activities increased, the officers were rearrested and sent to POW camps.

Camp history

These buildings were not adjacent to each other and were surrounded by barbed-wire fences.

In 1944 the Norwegian officers were located as follows: 630 in the Seminary; 290 in the high-school; 100 in the primary school; 80 in the Richter house; 30 in hospital.

There was also a sub-camp (Zweiglager), designated Oflag XXI-C/Z established at Gronówko near Leszno, between September 1943 and January 1945.

Liberation

In January 1945 the officers were marched out westward, finally arriving at Oflag III-A in Luckenwalde, south of Berlin. On 21 April 1945 the Red Army liberated the camp. On 5 May 1945 the Norwegians were transported east to a camp near Legnica in Silesia, then travelled for several days by train to Hamburg and Aarhus, Denmark, finally arriving in Oslo on 28 May 1945.

A Norwegian POW Museum was established in 1996 within the regional museum in the town-hall of Ostrzeszów.

See also
 List of prisoner-of-war camps in Germany
 Occupation of Norway by Nazi Germany

References

Oflags
Norwegian prisoners and detainees
Norwegian resistance movement
World War II sites in Poland